The 1988 Canadian federal election was held on November 21, 1988, to elect members to the House of Commons of Canada of the 34th Parliament of Canada.  It was an election largely fought on a single issue: the Canada–United States Free Trade Agreement (CUSFTA); the Progressive Conservative Party campaigned in favour of it whereas the Liberal Party and the New Democratic Party (NDP) campaigned against it.

The incumbent prime minister, Brian Mulroney, went on to lead his Progressive Conservative Party to a second majority government. Mulroney became the party's first leader since John A. Macdonald to win a second majority. The Liberal Party doubled their seat count and experienced a moderate recovery after the 1984 wipeout. The New Democratic Party won the highest number of seats at the time until they would beat that record in 2011. 

The election was the last won by the Progressive Conservatives, the last until 2011 in which a right-of-centre party formed a majority government, and the last where a right-of-centre party won the most seats in Quebec. It was also the last election in Canadian history in which only three parties would be elected to Parliament.

Background 

Brian Mulroney led the Progressive Conservative Party to a landslide majority government victory in the 1984 federal election. Despite this achievement, scandals including patronage damaged his polling numbers. However, in his fourth year in office in 1988, his popularity began to recover; a poll a few days before the election call showed the Progressive Conservatives ahead of the Liberal Party and New Democratic Party.

The Liberal Party led by John Turner suffered a heavy defeat in the 1984 election. Despite this, Turner stayed on as leader and was preparing to campaign for the second election. However, the Liberal Party was in financial and political disarray; by 1986 the party was heavily in debt and the expenses of the national organization continued to rise. Turner's office experienced significant staff turnover, and leaving members were willing to recount stories of the office's disfunction to the press, resulting in the Turner's leadership being nicknamed a "reign of error". Some pundits believed the Liberals would permanently drop to third place.

In 1988, Mulroney reached an agreement on free trade with the United States. Turner's Liberal Party and Ed Broadbent's New Democratic Party opposed the agreement; Turner believed that the agreement would "Americanize" Canada. Mulroney used his large majority to pass the bill through the House of Commons, however, the Liberal-dominated Senate demanded an election before they would pass it. The election was called on October 1.

Campaign 

The Liberals had some early struggles, notably during one day in Montreal where three different costs were given for the proposed Liberal daycare program. When asked by reporters about the incident, Turner's chief of staff responded using vulgar language. The campaign was also hampered by a Canadian Broadcasting Corporation (CBC) report that stated there was a movement in the backroom to replace Turner with Jean Chrétien, even though Turner had passed a leadership review in 1986 with 76.3 percent of delegates rejecting a leadership convention.

Turner strongly campaigned against free trade, arguing that it would cost many Canadian jobs. His October 25 debate performance helped polls suggest a Liberal government; a week after the debate, the Liberals were six points ahead of the PCs. The Liberal surge prompted the PCs to stop the relatively calm campaign they had been running and instead run a more negative campaign, capitalizing on the perceived lack of public confidence in Turner, his perceived inability to lead the Liberal Party, and arguing that he only opposed free trade because of political opportunism. The PCs' poll numbers started to rebound.

National results

The Progressive Conservatives won a reduced but strong majority government with 169 seats, and the free trade agreement would go into effect on January 1, 1989. Mulroney was the first Conservative prime minister since John A. Macdonald to win more than one majority. 

Despite the Liberals more than doubling their seat count from 38 to 83, the results were considered a disappointment for Turner, after polls in mid-campaign predicted a Liberal government. In an ironic reversal of most prior federal elections, the Liberals were kept out of power by their inability to make any headway into the overwhelming Tory majority in Quebec. Indeed, the Liberals actually lost five seats in Quebec. This second election loss sealed Turner's fate; he would eventually resign in 1990, and was succeeded by Jean Chrétien, who proved to be a more effective leader and when in government, accepted free trade with the United States and didn't overturn it. 

Despite the New Democratic Party enjoying their best result at the time (winning 43 seats), Ed Broadbent resigned as leader in 1989. Some NDP members were disappointed by the fact that they didn't become the Official Opposition.

Had the Progressive Conservatives won a minority government, there would have been a strong possibility of the Liberals forming government with the New Democratic Party holding the balance of power, as these two left-of-centre parties would have made up the majority of seats in the House of Commons.
 

 
Note:
 
"% change" refers to change from previous election

Vote and seat summaries

 

 
A number of unregistered parties also contested the election. The Western Canada Concept party, led by Doug Christie, fielded three candidates in British Columbia. The Western Independence Party ran one candidate in British Columbia, seven in Alberta, and three in Manitoba (although one of the Manitoba candidates appears to have withdrawn before election day).
 
The Liberal candidate in Etobicoke-Lakeshore, Emmanuel Feuerwerker, withdrew from the race after suffering a heart attack, resulting in the Liberals not running a candidate in all 295 ridings during this election.
 
The Marxist–Leninist Party fielded candidates in several ridings.
 
Blair T. Longley campaigned in British Columbia as a representative of the "Student Party". Newspaper reports indicate that this was simply a tax-avoidance scheme.
 
The moribund Social Credit Party fielded nine candidates, far short of the 50 required for official recognition. However, the Chief Electoral Officer allowed the party's name to appear on the ballot by virtue of its half-century history as a recognized party. It would be the last time that the party, which had been the third-largest or fourth-largest party in Canada at its height, would fight an election under its own name. The party was deregistered before the 1993 election after it failed to nominate enough candidates to keep its registration.

Results by province

 
xx - less than 0.05% of the popular vote.
 
Note: Parties that captured less than 1% of the vote in a province are not recorded.

Election milestones
Until the 2011 federal election, the 1988 election was the most successful in the New Democratic Party's history. The party dominated in British Columbia and Saskatchewan, won significant support in Ontario and elected its first (and, until the 2008 election, only) member from Alberta.

This was the second election contested by the Green Party, and it saw a more than 50 percent increase in its vote, but it remained a minor party.

The election was the last for Canada's Social Credit Party. The party won no seats, and won an insignificant portion of the popular vote.

This was the first election for the newly founded Reform Party which for this vote only contested seats in Western Canada. The party at this stage was filled to a large extent with former Socreds along with some former PC supporters disaffected at the perceived lack of support from the Mulroney government for western interests. It was led by Preston Manning, who was himself a one time Socred candidate and the son of longtime Alberta Social Credit premier Ernest Manning.

Reform won no seats and was not yet considered a major party at the national level. However, Deborah Grey would win the first seat for Reform, Beaver River in Alberta, in a by-election held four months later. Grey, who had finished a distant fourth running in the same riding in the general election, succeeded rookie Progressive Conservative MP John Dahmer. Dahmer was in office for only five days before dying of pancreatic cancer.

For the Progressive Conservatives, this was the last federal election they would ever win.

Notes
 Number of parties: 11
 First appearance: Christian Heritage Party, Reform Party
 Final appearance: Confederation of Regions Party, Social Credit Party
 Final appearance before hiatus: Communist Party (returned in 2000), Rhinoceros Party (returned in 2006)

10 closest ridings
 London-Middlesex, ON: Terry Clifford (PC) def. Garnet Bloomfield (Lib) by 8 votes
 Northumberland, ON: Christine Stewart (Lib) def. Reg Jewell (PC) by 28 votes
 Hamilton Mountain, ON: Beth Phinney (Lib) def. Marion Dewar (NDP) by 73 votes
 York North, ON: Maurizio Bevilacqua (Lib) def. Micheal O'Brien (PC) by 77 votes
 Rosedale, ON: David MacDonald (PC) def. Bill Graham (Lib) by 80 votes
 London East, ON: Joe Fontana (Lib) def. Jim Jepson (PC) by 102 votes
 Haldimand-Norfolk, ON: Bob Speller (Lib) def. Bud Bradley (PC) by 209 votes
 Hillsborough, PE: George Proud (Lib) def. Thomas McMillan (PC) by 259 votes
 Cariboo—Chilcotin, BC: Dave Worthy (PC) def. Jack Langford (NDP) by 269 votes
 Vancouver Centre, BC: future Prime Minister Kim Campbell (PC) def. Johanna Den Hertog (NDP) by 269 votes

See also

1911 Canadian federal election, an election similarly contested over free trade with the United States.
List of Canadian federal general elections
List of political parties in Canada
 
Articles on parties' candidates in this election:

 Independents
 Confederation of Regions
 Commonwealth
 Communist
 Green
 Libertarian
 Liberal
 New Democrats
 Progressive Conservative
 Rhinoceros

References

Notes

Party platforms

Further reading

External links
Riding map
Election 1988, by Stephen Azzi
Debate '88